Riachão do Dantas is a municipality located in the Brazilian state of Sergipe. Its population was 19,809 (2020) and its area is 528 km².

References

Municipalities in Sergipe